Arsen Suleymanovich Fadzaev (born 5 September 1962, in Chikola, North Ossetia–Alania, Russian SFSR, Soviet Union) is a former Soviet wrestler, World champion and Olympic champion in freestyle wrestling.

Olympics
Fadzaev competed at the 1988 Summer Olympics in Seoul where he received his first Olympic gold medal in freestyle wrestling. He won another gold medal at the 1992 Summer Olympics in Barcelona. He competed for Uzbekistan at the 1996 Summer Olympics in Atlanta, where he finished 13th.

References

External links
 

1962 births
Living people
People from Irafsky District
Sportspeople from North Ossetia–Alania
Soviet male sport wrestlers
Uzbekistani male sport wrestlers
Olympic wrestlers of the Soviet Union
Olympic wrestlers of the Unified Team
Olympic wrestlers of Uzbekistan
Wrestlers at the 1988 Summer Olympics
Wrestlers at the 1992 Summer Olympics
Wrestlers at the 1996 Summer Olympics
Russian male sport wrestlers
Olympic gold medalists for the Soviet Union
Olympic gold medalists for the Unified Team
Olympic medalists in wrestling
Ossetian people
Uzbekistani people of Ossetian descent
World Wrestling Championships medalists
Medalists at the 1992 Summer Olympics
Medalists at the 1988 Summer Olympics
Honoured Masters of Sport of the USSR
North Ossetian State University alumni
Recipients of the Order of Friendship of Peoples
Armed Forces sports society athletes
Fourth convocation members of the State Duma (Russian Federation)
Fifth convocation members of the State Duma (Russian Federation)
Members of the Federation Council of Russia (after 2000)